Banglanews24.com is an online news portal in Bangladesh. The website, along with the Daily Sun, Bangladesh Pratidin, and Kaler Kantho, are owned by East West Media Group, a concern of the Bashundhara Group. Alexa ranked the website 2620 worldwide and 15th in Bangladesh.

History
Banglanews24.com officially launched on 1 July 2010. The other national news agencies at the time were the state-owned Bangladesh Sangbad Sangstha (BSS), the privately-owned United News of Bangladesh (UNB), and bdnews24.com.

Sections
 National
 Politics
 Business
 International
 Sports
 Entertainment
 Technology
 Education
 Health
 Lifestyle
 Aviatour
 Banglanews Special
 Banglanews Exclusive
 Law
 Open Forum

Controversy 
Former Minister and current Awami League MP Ramesh Chandra Sen sued the portal for defamation in 2014. A photo journalist of the portal was assaulted by Paramilitary Bangladesh Ansar members in Shyamoli, Dhaka in March 2014. Bangladesh Islamist organisations that included Jamaat-e-Islami BangladeshI and its student front Islami Chhatra Shibir, Hefazat-e-Islam, Islami Oikya Jote, and Nabi Premik Jagrata Janata vandalized their offices in Chittagong, Bangladesh on 23 February 2013.

Sister concerns
 News24tv
 Bangladesh Pratidin
 Daily Sun
 Radio Capital
 Kaler Kantho

References

External links 
  (BN)
  (EN)

2010 establishments in Bangladesh
Bangladeshi news websites